The Tahtsa Ranges are a mountain range in northern British Columbia, Canada. It has an area of 7531 km2 and is a subrange of the Hazelton Mountains which in turn form part of the Interior Mountains.  Their general location is between the eastern flank of the Kitimat Ranges of the Coast Mountains and the Nechako Reservoir (Ootsa Lake).

Sub-ranges
Chikamin Range
Kasalka Range
Morice Range
Sibola Range
Tochquonyalla Range
Whitesail Range

See also
List of mountain ranges

References

Hazelton Mountains
Nechako Country